The 1997–98 Meistriliiga was the seventh season of the Meistriliiga, Estonia's premier football league. Flora won their third title.

Preliminary round
The preliminary round was played in the autumn. The top six teams continued the title play-off in the spring, taking half their points obtained in the preliminary round. The last two teams faced the top four of the Esiliiga in the Meistriliiga transition tournament.

League table

Results

Championship Tournament
The points obtained during the preliminary round were carried over halved and rounded up.

League table

Results

Meistriliiga Transition Tournament
Eesti Põlevkivi Jõhvi and Lelle, the teams finishing in the last two positions in the preliminary round, faced four best teams of the 1997–98 Esiliiga in the play-off for two places in the 1998 Meistriliiga.

Top scorers

See also
 1997 in Estonian football
 1998 in Estonian football

References

 Estonia - List of final tables (RSSSF)

Meistriliiga seasons
1998 in Estonian football
1997 in Estonian football
Estonia